The Kosovo Agency of Statistics monitors various demographic features of the population of Kosovo, such as population density, ethnicity, education level, health of the populace, economic status, religious affiliations and other aspects of the population. Censuses, normally conducted at ten-year intervals, record the demographic characteristics of the population. According to the first census conducted after the 2008 declaration of independence in 2011, the permanent population of Kosovo had reached 1,810,366.

Albanians form the majority in Kosovo, with over 93% of the total population; significant minorities include Bosniaks (1.6%), Serbs (1.5%) and others. A 2015 estimate put Kosovo's population at 1,870,981.

Kosovo has the youngest population in Europe. As of 2008, half of its roughly 2-million-strong population is under the age of 25, according to a recent report of the UN Development Programme, UNDP. According to the government data, it is estimated that more than 65 percent of the population are younger than 30.

History

2011 census
The final results of the 2011 census recorded Kosovo (excluding North Kosovo) as having 1,739,825 inhabitants. The European Centre for Minority Issues (ECMI) has called "for caution when referring to the 2011 census", due to the boycott by Serb-majority municipalities in North Kosovo and the large boycott by Serbs and Roma in southern Kosovo. The recorded total population was below most previous estimates. The census enjoyed considerable technical assistance from international agencies and appears to have been endorsed by Eurostat; it was, however, the first full census since 1981, and not one of an uninterrupted series. The results show that there were no people temporarily resident in hotels or refugee camps at the time of the census; that out of 312,711 conventional dwellings, 99,808 (over 30%) were unoccupied; and that three municipalities designed under the Ahtisaari Plan to have Serb majorities  - Klokot, Novo Brdo, and Štrpce - in fact had ethnic Albanian majorities (although their municipal assemblies have Serb majorities).

Vital statistics

Source: Kosovo Agency of Statistics
			
Population estimates in the table below may be unreliable during the 1990s period. Besides, vital statistics do not fully include data from Serb-majority territories. Since 2011, in accordance with European statistical norms, live births and deaths record figures in Kosovo only (excluding foreign countries).

Current vital statistics

Marriages and divorces

Administrative divisions

Kosovo is administratively subdivided into seven districts, and 38 municipalities. With the current estimation on population, Kosovo ranks as the 150th largest country in the world based on how populous it is.

Ethnic groups
The official results of the censuses in Kosovo after World War II are tabulated below. The figures for Albanians in the 1991 census were estimates only, since that census was boycotted by most Albanians. Similarly, the figures for Serbs in the 2011 census omit those in North Kosovska Mitrovica, Leposavić, Zubin Potok, and Zvečan (North Kosovo), while the number of Serbs and Romani in the rest of Kosovo is also deemed unreliable, due to the partial boycott.

Ethnic groups by municipality
The results of the 2011 census of ethnic groups in municipalities are tabulated below.

The 2000 Living Standard Measurement Survey by Statistical Office of Kosovo found an ethnic composition of the population as follows:

 92% Albanians
 8% others

A more comprehensive (October 2002) estimate (for the 1.9 million inhabitants) for these years:
 92% Albanians
 4% Serbs
 4% Bosniaks, Turks, Romani and others

During the Kosovo War in 1999, around 700,000 ethnic Albanians, over 100,000 ethnic Serbs and more than 40,000 Bosniaks were forced out of Kosovo to neighbouring Albania, North Macedonia, Montenegro, Bosnia and Serbia.
After the United Nations took over administration of Kosovo following the war, the vast majority of the Albanian refugees returned.
The largest diaspora communities of Kosovo Albanians are in Switzerland and Austria accounting for some 200,000 individuals each, or for 20% of the population resident in Kosovo.

Many non-Albanians – chiefly Serbs and Romani – fled or were expelled, mostly to the rest of Serbia at the end of the war, with further refugee outflows occurring as the result of sporadic ethnic violence. As of 2002, the number of registered refugees was around 250,000. The non-Albanian population in Kosovo is now about half of its pre-war total. The largest concentration of Serbs in the country is in the north, but many remain in Kosovo Serb enclaves surrounded by Albanian-populated areas.

Languages

As defined by the Constitution of Kosovo, Albanian and Serbian are official languages in Kosovo. According to the 2011 census, almost 95% of the citizens speak Albanian as their native language, followed by South Slavic languages and Turkish. Due to North Kosovo's boycott of the census, Bosnian came in as the second-largest language after Albanian. However, Serbian is in reality the second-most spoken language in Kosovo.

Health
Harvard Medical School and NATO published a study on the impact of the conflict on Kosovo health system in 2014.
The data in the table below are from the Kosovo Agency of Statistics.

Migration
According to a 2015 report by Geoba.se, Kosovo's current net migration rate is at –3.72, ranking Kosovo 197th, due to the ongoing political and economic crisis. The same source gives –0.71 for the 2023 estimate.

Religion

The country has no official religion. The constitution establishes Kosovo as a secular state that is neutral in matters of religious beliefs and where everyone is equal before the law and freedom to belief, conscience and religion is guaranteed.

The 2011 Kosovo population census was largely boycotted by the Kosovo Serbs (who predominantly identify as Serbian Orthodox Christians), especially in North Kosovo, leaving the Serb population underrepresented. The results of the 2011 census gave the following religious affiliations for the population included in the census:

Almost all Muslims in Kosovo are Sunni Muslim.

The Serb population is largely Serbian Orthodox. The Catholic Albanian communities are mostly concentrated in Gjakova, Prizren, Klina and a few villages near Peć and Vitina (see laramans). Slavic-speaking Catholics usually call themselves Janjevci or Kosovan Croats. Slavic-speaking Muslims in the south of Kosovo are known as the Gorani people.

Internally displaced persons

According to the CIA, there were 17,300 internally displaced persons, most of whom are Serbs displaced during the Kosovo War.

Kosovo Demographics Profile

Population
1,935,259 (July 2021 est.)

Nationality:
Kosovar (Albanian)

Ethnic groups	Albanians 92.9%, Bosniaks 1.6%, Serbs 1.5%, Turk 1.1%, Ashkali 0.9%, Egyptian 0.7%, Gorani 0.6%, Romani 0.5%, other/unspecified 0.2% (2011 est.)

note: these estimates may under-represent Serb, Romani, and some other ethnic minorities because they are based on the 2011 Kosovo national census, which excluded northern Kosovo (a largely Serb-inhabited region) and was partially boycotted by Serb and Romani communities in southern Kosovo

Languages:
Albanian (official) 94.5%, Bosnian 1.7%, Serbian (official) 1.6%, Turkish 1.1%, other 0.9% (includes Romani), unspecified 0.1%; note - in municipalities where a community's mother tongue is not one of Kosovo's official languages, the language of that community may be given official status according to the 2006 Law on the Use of Languages (2011 est.)

Religions
Muslim 95.6%, Roman Catholic 2.2%, Orthodox 1.5%, other 0.1%, none 0.1%, unspecified 0.6% (2011 est.)

Age structure
0-14 years: 24.07% (male 241,563/female 223,568)
15-24 years: 16.95% (male 170,566/female 157,063)
25-54 years: 42.56% (male 433,914/female 388,595)
55-64 years: 8.67% (male 85,840/female 81,782)
65 years and over: 7.75% (male 63,943/female 85,940) (2020 est.)

Median age
total: 30.5 years
male: 30.2 years
female: 30.8 years (2020 est.)

Population growth rate
0.67% (2021 est.)

Birth rate	15.05 births/1,000 population (2021 est.)

Death rate	6.91 deaths/1,000 population (2021 est.)

Net migration rate	-1.44 migrant(s)/1,000 population (2021 est.)

Sex ratio at birth 
1.08 male(s)/female
0-14 years: 1.08 male(s)/female
15-24 years: 1.09 male(s)/female
25-54 years: 1.12 male(s)/female
55-64 years: 1.05 male(s)/female
65 years and over: 0.74 male(s)/female
total population: 1.06 male(s)/female (2020 est.)

Infant mortality rate
total: 35.93 deaths/1,000 live births
male: 37.99 deaths/1,000 live births
female: 33.7 deaths/1,000 live births (2021 est.)

Life expectancy at birth
total population: 72.99 years
male: 70.8 years
female: 75.35 years (2021 est.)

Total fertility rate
1.92 children born/woman (2021 est.)

See also
 Demographics of the Socialist Federal Republic of Yugoslavia
 
 Demographics of Albania
 Demographics of Montenegro
 Demographics of North Macedonia
 Demographics of Serbia
 Albanians in Kosovo
 Bosniaks in Kosovo
 Montenegrins in Kosovo
 Serbs in Kosovo
 Turks in Kosovo
 Roma in Kosovo
 Gorani (ethnic group)
 Janjevci
 Ashkali
History of the Jews in Kosovo

Notes and references

Notes

Annotations

References

Sources

External links
Statistical Office of Kosovo
Filling the Vacuum: Ensuring Protection and Legal Remedies for Minorities in Kosovo by Minority Rights Group International (May 2009)
Groups working with all demographics in Kosovo

 
Society of Kosovo
Demographics of Yugoslavia